Santa Julia station is an embanked metro station located on Line 4A of the Santiago Metro in Santiago, Chile, between Vicuña Mackenna station and La Granja station in the commune of La Florida. It lies along the Vespucio Sur Freeway at the junction with Santa Julia Street.
The station was opened on 16 August 2006 as part of the inaugural section of the line between Vicuña Mackenna and La Cisterna.

The area around the station is mainly residential and contains the Villa O’Higgins Family Health Center (Spanish: Centro de Salud Familiar Villa O’Higgins). The station also has disabled access.

Etymology
The station is named after the avenue at whose junction it is located Santa Julia Avenue.

References

External links 
La Florida Municipality website (in Spanish)
Santa Julia Metro Station data sheet on Santiago’s Metro web site
Metro de Santiago website (in Spanish)
 National institute of Statistics

Santiago Metro stations
Railway stations opened in 2006